The Delaware General Corporation Law (Title 8, Chapter 1 of the Delaware Code) is the statute of the Delaware Code that governs corporate law in the U.S. state of Delaware. Adopted in 1899, the statute has since seen Delaware become the most important jurisdiction in United States corporate law. Delaware is considered a corporate haven because of its business-friendly corporate laws compared to most other U.S. states. Over half of publicly traded corporations listed in the New York Stock Exchange (including its owner, Intercontinental Exchange) and 66% of the Fortune 500, including Walmart, the world's largest company by revenue, are incorporated (and therefore have its domicile for service of process purposes) in the state.

History

Delaware acquired its status as a corporate haven in the early 20th century. Following the example of New Jersey, which enacted corporate-friendly laws at the end of the 19th century to attract businesses from New York, Delaware adopted on March 10, 1899, a general incorporation act aimed at attracting more businesses. The group that pushed for this legislation intended to establish a corporation that would sell services to other businesses incorporating in Delaware. Before the rise of general incorporation acts, forming a corporation required a special act of the state legislature. General incorporation allowed anyone to form a corporation by simply raising money and filing articles of incorporation with the state's Secretary of State.

Other legal aspects
Because of the extensive experience of the Delaware courts, Delaware has a more well-developed body of case law than other states, which serves to give corporations and their counsel greater guidance on matters of corporate governance and transaction liability issues. Disputes over the internal affairs of Delaware corporations are usually filed in the Delaware Court of Chancery, which is a separate court of equity, as opposed to a court of law. Because it is a court of equity, there are no juries; its cases are heard by judges, called chancellors. Since 2018, the court has consisted of one chancellor and six vice-chancellors. The court is a trial court, with one chancellor hearing each case. Litigants may appeal final decisions of the Court of Chancery to the Delaware Supreme Court.

Delaware has also attracted major credit card banks because of its relaxed rules regarding interest. Many U.S. states have usury laws limiting the amount of interest a lender can charge. Federal law allows a national bank to "import" these laws from the state in which its principal office is located. Delaware (among others) has relatively relaxed interest laws, so several national banks have decided to locate their principal office in Delaware. National banks are, however, corporations formed under federal law, not Delaware law. A corporation formed under Delaware state law benefits from the relaxed interest rules to the extent it conducts business in Delaware, but is subject to restrictions of other states' laws if it conducts business in other states.

Pursuant to the "internal affairs doctrine", corporations which act in more than one state are subject only to the laws of their state of incorporation with regard to the regulation of the internal affairs of the corporation. As a result, Delaware corporations are subject almost exclusively to Delaware law, even when they do business in other states.

While most states require a for-profit corporation to have at least one director and two officers, Delaware laws do not have this restriction. All offices may be held by a single person who also can be the sole shareholder. The person, who does not need to be a U.S. citizen or resident, may also operate anonymously with only the listing agent through whom the company is registered named.

Tax benefits and burdens
Delaware charges no income tax on corporations not operating within the state, so taking advantage of Delaware's other benefits does not result in taxation. At the same time, Delaware has a particularly aggressive tax on banks that locate in the state. However, in general, the state is viewed as a positive location for corporate tax purposes because favorable laws of incorporation allow companies to minimize corporate expenditures (achieved through legal standardization of corporate legal processes), creating a nucleus in Delaware with operating companies often in other states.

In addition, Delaware has used its position as the state of incorporation to generate revenue from its abandoned and unclaimed property laws. Under U.S. Supreme Court precedent, the state of incorporation gets to keep any abandoned and unclaimed property, such as uncashed checks and unredeemed gift certificates, if the corporation does not have information about the location of the owner of the property.

Delaware charges a franchise tax on the corporations incorporated in it. Franchise taxes in Delaware are higher than in most other states which typically get revenue from corporate income taxes on the portion of the corporation's business done in that state. Delaware's franchise taxes supply about one-fifth of its state revenue.

In February 2013, The Economist published an article on tax-friendly jurisdictions, commenting that Delaware stood for "Dollars and Euros Laundered And Washed At Reasonable Expense". Jeffrey W. Bullock, Delaware's Secretary of State, insists that the state has struck the right balance between curbing criminality and "paying deference to the millions of legitimate businesspeople who benefit" from hassle-free incorporation.

2013 amendments
On June 30, 2013, Delaware Governor Jack Markell signed into law amendments to the Delaware General Corporation Law that affect several provisions in the current law and could substantially affect the process through which public companies are merged. The new legislation took effect August 1, 2013, except for ratification of defective corporate acts amendment which took effect in 2014.

Securities law 
In 2020, the Delaware Supreme Court upheld a provision allowing companies to require in their certificates of incorporation all Securities Act of 1933 claims to be filed in federal court.

DGCL 203 is particularly known as an antitakeover law.

See also

Combined reporting
Corporation Service Company
Corporation Trust Center (CT Corporation), Wilmington, Delaware, home to over 6,500 Delaware corporations
Corporation
Corporate haven
Delaware Journal of Corporate Law
Say on pay
Flag of convenience (business)
United Kingdom company law

Notes

External links
Delaware Department of State, Division of Corporations Official website, corporation name search.
Delaware's General Corporation Law
Delaware Division of Corporations
The Delaware Journal of Corporate Law

Types of business entity
Corporation
United States corporate law